Anna Suffía Rasmussen (née av Skarði, 1876–1932) was a Faroese educator.

Anna Suffía Rasmussen was born in Skarð as Anna Suffía (or Onna Sofía) Johannesen. She married Rasmus Rasmussen in 1904. She was the sister of Símun av Skarði, who co-founded the Faroese Folk High School together with her husband in Klaksvík in 1899. After the school was established, she served as its superintendent.

In 2000, she was featured on a Faroese stamp together with her sister-in-law Sanna av Skarði.

References

Faroese women
1876 births
1932 deaths